Spectacles are smartglasses dedicated to recording video for the Snapchat service. This term is often used to address sunglasses and eyeglasses. They feature a camera lens and are capable of recording short video segments and syncing with a smartphone to upload to the user's online account. They were developed and manufactured by Snap Inc., and announced on September 23, 2016. The smartglasses were released on November 10, 2016. They are made for Snap's image messaging and multimedia platform, Snapchat, and were initially distributed exclusively through Snap's pop-up vending machine, Snapbot. On February 20, 2017, Snap Spectacles became available for purchase online.

On April 26, 2018, a second-generation of the Spectacles launched in 17 countries. This version included both software and hardware updates including water resistance functionality and increased storage.

On September 5, 2018, two improved second-generation Spectacles were released. The two new versions, dubbed Nico and Veronica, included major design changes that reflect more typical sunglasses styles.

On August 13, 2019, Snap announced its Spectacles 3, which featured a new minimalistic frame and two cameras to replicate stereoscopic vision. The Spectacles shipped in November 2019 for $380.

History 
In December 2014 Snap Inc., then Snapchat Inc., acquired Vergence Labs  the developers of the Epiphany Eyewear smartglasses. Vergence Labs was founded by entrepreneur Erick Miller in 2011 before Google Glass was announced. Miller worked on the idea as a graduate student at UCLA and poured his life savings into building the product. Snapchat was impressed with the Epiphany Eyewear product and the great team assembled by Miller, and acquired Vergence to develop a similar eyewear product.

Epiphany Eyewear which recorded wide-angle point-of-view videos, had been positioned as Vergence's first step toward eventually building full featured augmented reality glasses which, according to Miller, would someday "give people what would previously be called superpowers".  However, due to Vergence's small engineering team (consisting of founder ceo Erick Miller, co-founder Jon Rodriguez, software engineer Peter Brook, and designer / mechanical engineer David Meisenholder), the company had to scale back its ambitions in order to ship it's simpler first product, Epiphany Eyewear, which the team was able to successfully ship despite their extremely limited funding and team size.  The successful development and launch of their product led to the company being noticed by Snapchat, which quietly acquired them, bringing them in-house to develop a similar but much more refined eyewear product for Snapchat.

In October 2015, a leaked online video showed an early version of the new glasses, dubbed "Spectacles." on mid 2016, news outlets reported that Snapchat was hiring engineers from Microsoft, Nokia and Qualcomm. Reporters speculated that the hires were to build the new glasses.

The new product was unveiled on September 24, 2016, and released on November 10, 2016. The glasses were sold through Snapbot, a proprietary vending machine for the smartglasses, which was located near Snap's headquarters in Venice, Los Angeles.

In May 2017, a Snapchat patent became public which included an illustration of a hypothetical future version of Spectacles with augmented reality capabilities.

In late 2017, Snapchat wrote off $40m worth of unsold Spectacles inventory and unused parts. As of May 2018, the company sold 220,000 pairs, which was less than initially expected. In April 2018, the company launched Spectacles 2.0, which included additional colors, lighter frames, the option of mirrored lenses, and the removal of the bright yellow ring around the camera window.

In June 2018, Snap released an update for Spectacles allowing users to export videos from the glasses in square or widescreen format.

In November 2018, it was reported that the company would release a new version of Spectacles by year end 2018 that included two cameras. The Snap Spectacles 3, which did feature two HD cameras on-device, were ultimately announced in August 2019. 

In 2022, Snap announced the Spectacles 4, featuring AR, which are still pending public release.

Design

Hardware 
The original version of the glasses included a camera lens with a 115° field of view (110° on V2) and records in a circular format that adapts to a smartphone's screen size and orientation. The smartglasses record when the user presses a button on the top left of its frame, for a maximum of 30 seconds (in 10 second intervals). They sync with its designated smartphone via Bluetooth and Wi-Fi. The camera also houses a ring of LED lights that indicates battery level and when they are recording. The pair of glasses charge in a yellow case that has a built-in battery and connects to its proprietary cable.  The cable can be attached either to the case or directly to the glasses.  According to the manufacturer, the fully charged case will hold enough power to recharge the glasses four times. The lithium-ion batteries in both the case and the glasses draw power from a standard 5 volt USB power supply, and connect via a USB cable which is held in place by small magnets.

Software 

Spectacles glasses capture video in a circular format, as shown in the thumbnail to the right.  Snap Inc claims this is to more closely approximate the field of view of the human eye.

The glasses are exclusive to Snap Inc's service, Snapchat. They are paired by looking at the user's account Snapcode and pressing the button on the glasses frame, as well as connecting to them via Bluetooth (for iOS devices). The videos taken on the glasses are stored internally within the camera and can be viewed and individually uploaded in the "Memories" section of Snapchat.

Snapbot 

A Snapbot is a pop-up vending machine developed and manufactured by Snap Inc. It was designed for the distribution of Spectacles. Snapbot first appeared on November 10, 2016, in Venice, Los Angeles, and was then located in Big Sur, California. Snapbot was relocated to different locations in the U.S. for several months after the release of Spectacles. In February 2017, Snapchat began selling Spectacles online.

See also 
 Smartglasses
 Microsoft HoloLens
 HTC Vive
 Google Glass

References

External links 
 Official website

Cameras
Eyewear brands of the United States
Products introduced in 2016
Products introduced in 2018
2016 establishments in California
Snap Inc.
Wearable devices
Wearable computers